Mount Blick is a conical peak rising to over 1400 m in the north extremity of Carlstrom Foothills, Churchill Mountains. The peak is on the west side of Bally Glacier, 8 nautical miles (15 km) east-southeast of Pyramid Mountain. Named by Advisory Committee on Antarctic Names (US-ACAN) in honor of Graeme Blick, Geodetic Survey Advisor, Office of the New Zealand Surveyor-General, 1996–2002. From 1998 to the present he has worked closely with the US Geological Survey on geodetic surveys in the Ross Sea Region and has overseen the development of the new Ross Sea Region Geodetic Datum 2000.

Mountains of Oates Land